Melcher-Dallas Community School District is a rural public school district headquartered in Melcher-Dallas, Iowa.

The district is completely within Marion County. The district serves the city of Melcher-Dallas and surrounding rural areas.

The school's mascot is the Saints. Their colors are maroon and white.

Schools
Melcher-Dallas Elementary School
Melcher-Dallas High School

Melcher-Dallas High School

Athletics 
The Saints compete in the Bluegrass Conference, including the following sports:

Volleyball 
Football (8-man)
Basketball (boys and girls)
Wrestling (as part of Southeast Warren)
Track and Field (boys and girls)
Golf (boys and girls)
Baseball 
Softball

See also
List of school districts in Iowa
List of high schools in Iowa

References

External links
 Melcher-Dallas Community School District

School districts in Iowa
Education in Marion County, Iowa